Yekaterina Chemberdzhi, also Katia Tchemberdji (nickname) or Jekaterina Wladimirowna Tschemberdschi (German form) (born 6 May 1960), is a Russian pianist and composer.

Life and career
The daughter of Vladimir Posner and Valentina Chemberdzhi and granddaughter of the composers Zara Levina and  Nikolai Chemberdzhi, Katia Chemberdzhi was born in Moscow and began her study of music at age 7. In 1978 she studied composition and piano at the Moscow Conservatory with Nikolai Korndorf and Yuri Kholopov.

After ending her studies, Chemberdzhi took a position from 1984-90 teaching at the Moscow Gnessin State Musical College. In 1990 she moved to West Berlin. She has been active in international festivals as a pianist and as a composer. Her compositions were commissioned by such festivals as Berliner Festspiele, Kuhmo Chamber Music Festival, Tage Neuer Musik Zürich, and performed and commissioned by such  soloists and ensembles as The Hilliard Ensamble, Charoun Ensemble, Sibelius Quartet, Staats- und Domchor Berlin, Singakademie zu Berlin, Münchner Kammerorchester, Boris Pergamenschikow, Natalia Gutman, Eduard Brunner, Charles Neidich etc.
She has composed film music for several Russian and German films.

Works
Selected works include:
1990: Sonate for clarinet and piano
1991: Heidelberg Trio, for clarinet, violin and piano
1991: In memoriam, for storyteller, piano, horn, violin and cello after poems by Anna Akhmatova
1991: In Namen Amadeus, for viola, clarinet, piano and tape
1995: Day and night: Hommage à M. C. Escher, for solo piano
1996: Labyrinth in memoriam Oleg Kagan, for string orchestra (3 quartets) and solo cello
1998: Max and Moritz, chamber opera after William Busch
2000: String Quartet No. 2, after Rainer Maria Rilke
2003: Opposition, for ensemble
2003: Three Bow Dances, for cello and piano
2003: Ma´or, for solo clarinet
2006: Abschiedsgesänge, for four vocal soloists and chamber orchestra after poems of Rainer Maria Rilke and Apollonius Rhodius
2007: Rettet Pluto!, Kinderoper
2009: Die Fragen des Bartholomäus, for five solo singers, choir, organ and orchestra

Selected Recordings
Chamber Works

References

http://www.tchemberdji.com/
http://mugi.hfmt-hamburg.de/Tchemberdji/
http://www.sikorski.de/de/frameloader.html?frame=http%3A//www.sikorski.de/composers/composer107.html

1960 births
Living people
20th-century classical composers
Russian music educators
Women classical composers
Russian classical composers
Russian people of Jewish descent
Women music educators
20th-century women composers